Şələ is a village in the municipality of Mirimli in the Yardymli Rayon of Azerbaijan.

References

Populated places in Yardimli District